Main aur Charles is a 2015 Bollywood crime film written and directed by Prawaal Raman and produced by Cynozure Networkz. The film is a fictitious thriller inspired by true events; it is told from the perspective of the Indian cop, Amod Kanth, who handled the case of the Indian Origin French serial killer Charles Sobhraj who was known as the bikini killer. The film opened on 30 October 2015 to positive reviews across India. However, it was a box office flop, grossing  against a   budget.

The film stars Randeep Hooda, Richa Chadda, Adil Hussain, Tisca Chopra, and Alexx O'Nell in lead roles. Through the narrative, we see a series of crimes committed by Charles and the story of each of his victims, who fell for his charisma but were betrayed by his serpentine nature. The man not just escaped several high security jails but also manipulated the legal system. In the title, Main aur Charles, the word 'Main' means 'me' and stands for the character of Amod Kanth. The film was warmly accepted in the trade for its impeccable direction, casting and background score. Apart from these technicalities, the film has satisfied critics creatively with fine performances by Hooda, Chadha and Hussain.

Cast 

 Randeep Hooda - Hatchand Bhaonani Gurumukh Charles Sobhraj / Zubin Pratap
 Richa Chaddha - Mira Sharma (Charles's girl friend)
 Adil Hussain - Amod Kanth
 Alexx O'Nell - Richard Thomas
 Lucky Morani - Dr. Ashima Mehra (criminal psychologist)
 Mandana Karimi - Liz (Charles's girl friend)
 Shaanti - Princess Malvika
 Dijana Dejanovic - Charles's Lawyer
 Vipin Sharma - Satender Kumar (Jailor)
 Tisca Chopra - Reena (Amod Kanths' wife)
 Kanika Kapoor - Special appearance as bar singer
 Anastasia Fullfina - Andrea (Charles's girl friend)
 Nandu Madhav - Inspector Sudhakar Zhende
 Saurabh Sarkar- Bajrangi Babu
 Sandeep Punia - Satpal Punia
 Satyakam Gupta - Rajan Ahuja
 Shanu Dev - Mr.Joshi (Investigating Officer)
 Abhiskek Diwan - Hemant

Production 

The film was shot in Delhi, Goa, Mumbai, Pattaya, and Udaipur.

Soundtrack 

The music for Main Aur Charles is composed by Vipin Patwa, Aditya Trivedi, Bally Grunge and Sanjeev-Darshan. The full audio album was released on 15 October 2015. The music rights are acquired by T-Series.

Reception
Shubhra Gupta for The Indian Express rated 1 star out of 5 and wrote "The film should have been riveting. But it comes off as a slapdash, confused collage of scenes involving the famous jail break in which the real life Sobhraj broke free with several prisoners: it was the kind of astoundingly brazen 'kaand' whose reverberations were felt in the system for a long time." Sweta Kaushal for Hindustan Times wrote "The film does not just fail, it crashes miserably." Nandini Ramnath for Scroll.in wrote "The brazen fun that Charles and his cohorts are having is contrasted with the routine police work by Adil Hussain’s overly loud and morally outraged cop. Hussain’s outrage at Charles seems to be the result of envy." On review aggregator website Rotten Tomatoes, the film holds an approval rating of 33% based on 6 reviews, and an average rating of 5/10. Rachit Gupta for Filmfare wrote "Main Aur Charles is also a period film. But most of it takes place on beaches in Goa, courtrooms and jails. Locations that haven’t really changed in the past 30 odd years. So the only place that you actually get to see a simulated sense of the ‘70s and ‘80s is the fashion."

References

External links 
 

2015 films
Films scored by Vipin Patwa
Indian erotic thriller films
2010s Hindi-language films
Films shot in Bangkok
Films shot in Goa
Films shot in Delhi
Films shot in Mumbai
2010s avant-garde and experimental films
Films shot in Madhya Pradesh
Films shot in Thailand
2015 crime drama films
Indian avant-garde and experimental films
Indian crime drama films
Biographical films about serial killers
Biographical films about fraudsters
Cultural depictions of French men
Cultural depictions of male serial killers
Cultural depictions of fraudsters
Films directed by Prawaal Raman